Enoch Arden is a narrative poem by Alfred, Lord Tennyson, published in 1864 during his tenure as British poet laureate. The story on which it was based was provided to Tennyson by Thomas Woolner. The poem lends its name to a principle in law that after being missing for a certain number of years (typically seven) a person may be declared dead for purposes of remarriage and inheritance of their survivors.

Background 

The hero of the poem, fisherman turned merchant sailor Enoch Arden, leaves his wife Annie and three children to go to sea with his old captain, who offers him work after he had lost his job due to an accident; in a manner that reflects the hero's masculine view of personal toil and hardship to support his family, Enoch Arden left his family to better serve them as a husband and father. However, during his voyage, Enoch Arden is shipwrecked on a desert island with two companions; both eventually die, leaving Arden alone there. This part of the story is reminiscent of Robinson Crusoe. Enoch Arden remains lost and missing for at least eleven and half years. This is all referenced in the text of the work. It is after ten years that Phillip Ray asks Annie to marry him, stating that it is obvious Enoch is dead. Phillip states this is obvious not only because Enoch has not returned, but there has been no word. It was not unusual for merchant boats in 18th century England (indicated by the fact that Tennyson states at the beginning of the poem that the children played together 100 years prior to the story.) often stayed away for months and even years. However, in port towns as described in this work, there was always some rumor of the ship's whereabouts since this was common work for men who lived in such places. At the time that Phillip proposes to Annie (ten years after Enoch has been missing) Annie gets Phillip to agree to wait a year. A year passes, and Phillip proposes to Annie again. She puts him off for what is described in the text as another "half-year." At this point Annie goes to bed reading her Bible and asks for a sign as to whether Enoch is dead or alive, she dreams of Enoch being on a desert island and misinterprets this as him being in heaven. They marry and have a child.

He finds upon his return from the sea that, after his long absence, his wife, who believed him dead, is married happily to another man, his childhood friend Philip (Annie has known both men since her childhood, thus the rivalry), and has a child by him. Enoch's life remains unfulfilled, with one of his children now dead, and his wife and remaining children now being cared for by his onetime rival.

Enoch never reveals to his wife and children that he is really alive, as he loves her too much to spoil her new happiness. Enoch dies of a broken heart.

The story could be considered a variation on and antithesis to the classical myth of Odysseus, who, after an absence of 20 years at the Trojan War and at sea, found a faithful wife who had been loyally waiting for him. The use of the name Enoch for a man who disappears from the lives of his loved ones is surely inspired by the biblical character Enoch. In fact, also the entire chronological structure of the protagonist's life with its cycles related to the biblical symbolism of the "days of Creation" binds to the name of Enoch, as demonstrated by the analysis of an Italian thinker long interested in this work, and denotes Tennyson's ability to insert theological intentions into simple elegiac mode with an unprecedented complexity in English literature.

Musical settings 
In 1897, Richard Strauss set the poem as a recitation for speaker and piano, published as his Op. 38. On 24 May 1962, Columbia Records released a recording of Enoch Arden (recorded 2–4 October 1961) with Glenn Gould on the piano and Claude Rains as the speaker. The LP was made at a cost of $1500, and only 2000 copies were released. It remains a collector's item. In 2010, Chad Bowles and David Ripley released a CD, and in 2020 a recording was made in German by pianist Kirill Gerstein and Swiss actor Bruno Ganz. 
Conductor Emil de Cou arranged a version for chamber orchestra and narrator. This was performed with the Virginia Chamber Orchestra and actor Gary Sloan in 2010. The British actor Christopher Kent and pianist Gamal Khamis performed a semi-staged livestream performance during the 2020 lockdown and subsequently recorded a critically acclaimed CD for SOMM Recordings, which was released in 2022.

In popular culture 
 In Evelyn Sharp's 1897 children's novel The Making of a Schoolgirl, the girls put on a play of Enoch Arden for a student's birthday.
 The Guy de Maupassant story "Le Retour" has a similar plot.
 Enoch Arden, the 1911 film directed by D. W. Griffith, is based on this poem.
 The 1915 film of the same name was directed by Christy Cabanne.
 The 1925 Australian film The Bushwhackers is based on this poem.
 Franklin Wescott in the 1936 novel Anne of Windy Poplars, the fourth book in the Anne of Green Gables series, says, "Those last two lines in Enoch Arden made me so mad one night, I did fire the book through the window. But I picked it up the next day for the sake of the Bugle Song."
 The 1940 comedy film Too Many Husbands was based on the story, with Jean Arthur playing the wife of the returning husband, played by Fred MacMurray. It was remade in 1955 as Three for the Show, with Betty Grable, Jack Lemmon, Marge Champion and Gower Champion.
 The 1940 screwball comedy film My Favorite Wife is a comic inversion of Enoch Arden.
 Agatha Christie referenced the poem in three stories. "While the Light Lasts", a short story first published in The Novel Magazine in April 1924, has its protagonist Tim Nugent suffer the same chain of events as did Arden. The same plot arc was used, to greater effect, as part of Giant's Bread (1930), the first of six novels written by Christie under the pseudonym of Mary Westmacott.. Finally, in the crime novel Taken at the Flood (1948), the character Charles Trenton is lost in the South African bush and presumed dead; upon his return, he uses the pseudonym "Enoch Arden" as he attempts to blackmail his wife Rosaleen and her new family.
 The 1946 film Tomorrow Is Forever, starring Claudette Colbert, Orson Welles and George Brent, is based on the poem, although no writing or adaptation credit is given to Tennyson.
 Move Over, Darling is a 1963 remake of My Favorite Wife, starring Doris Day, James Garner and Polly Bergen. This project was undertaken after the 1962 Marilyn Monroe version, Something's Got to Give, was aborted upon Monroe's death.
 The 1966 Konkani film Nirmon is based on this story.
 The 1967 Hindi film Taqdeer was a remake of the Konkani film Nirmon.
 The 2000 film Cast Away was loosely based on this story.

See also 
 1864 in poetry

References

External links 

 

Poetry by Alfred, Lord Tennyson
British poems
1864 poems
Arden, Enoch
Narrative poems
Arden, Enoch
Poems adapted into films
Works about polygamy